The 2000 Formula Renault 2000 Eurocup season was the tenth Eurocup Formula Renault 2.0 season. The season began with non-championship round at Mugello Circuit on 16 April and finished at the Circuit Ricardo Tormo in Valencia on 10 December, after ten races. Cram Competition driver Felipe Massa claimed the championship title, taking three victories at Monza, Valencia and Magny-Cours. Charles Zwolsman Jr. finished as runner-up, losing 16 points to Massa. J.D. Motorsport's Matteo Grassotto won race at Circuit Park Zandvoort. His teammate Richard Antinucci took the first place in the next race at Spa. Other wins were scored by Markus Winkelhock, Kimi Räikkönen and Jörg Hardt.

Calendar

References

Eurocup
Eurocup Formula Renault
Renault Eurocup